Roosevelt Blackmon III (born September 10, 1974) was an American football cornerback in the National Football League (NFL). He was drafted by the Green Bay Packers in the 4th round of the 1998 NFL Draft. Blackmon played in 3 games for the Packers in 1998 before joining the Cincinnati Bengals mid-season. He played in 12 games for the Bengals in 1998. Blackmon played in 5 games for the Bengals and started 3 in 1999. He left the NFL after the 1999 season.

American football cornerbacks
Green Bay Packers players
Cincinnati Bengals players
1974 births
Living people